Michael Skelde (born 13 August 1973) is a Danish former professional road cyclist and current manager of .

Major results

1997
 7th GP Herning
 9th GP Aarhus
1999
 1st Stage 2 Tour of Rhodes
 4th Rund um Düren
 6th Ronde van Drenthe
 8th Ronde van Noord-Holland
2000
 2nd Poreč Trophy 3
 7th Grand Prix Midtbank
 9th GP Aarhus
2001
 4th Groningen–Münster
 9th Rund um die Hainleite-Erfurt
 10th Paris–Bourges
2002
 5th GP Aarhus
 6th Tour de Berne
 8th Groningen–Münster
 9th Rund um Köln
 10th Hel van het Mergelland
2003
 2nd Overall Étoile de Bessèges
 4th GP du canton d'Argovie
 5th Overall Uniqa Classic
 5th Grote Prijs Jef Scherens
 5th Boucles de l'Aulne
 6th Overall Danmark Rundt
 9th Luk-Cup Bühl
2005
 8th GP Aarhus
2007
 3rd East Midlands International CiCLE Classic

References

External links
 

1973 births
Living people
Danish male cyclists
People from Horsens
Sportspeople from the Central Denmark Region